The 1981–82 Ranji Trophy was the 48th season of the Ranji Trophy. The final between Delhi and Karnataka went into a sixth day before Delhi won on first innings lead.

Highlights
 The final between Delhi and Karnataka was extended to a sixth day to allow the first innings to be decided. Delhi took the lead on the sixth day.
 Raghuram Bhat of Karnataka took a hat-trick in the semifinal against Bombay in the semifinal. Towards the end of the match, Sunil Gavaskar batted left handed.
Laxman Sivaramakrishnan took 7 wickets for 28 runs on his debut in first class cricket, for Tamil Nadu against Delhi in the quarter final. Delhi won by 20 runs despite being bowled out for 117 in the second innings.

The Tamil Nadu - Delhi match at the M. A. Chidambaram Stadium saw two crowd incidents. T. E. Srinivasan was given out off the last ball of the second day. As the players came off, the crowd invaded the ground and the pavilion shouting slogans against the umpires and the Delhi captain Mohinder Amarnath, dispersing only after an hour. On the fourth day, S. Vasudevan was given out caught off the pad the crowd again invaded the field. The "umpires were manhandled, chairs thrown on to the field and benches wrenched apart" before the police intervened.

Group stage

South Zone

West Zone

North Zone

Central Zone

East Zone

Knockout stage

Final

Scorecards and averages
Cricketarchive

References

External links

1982 in Indian cricket
Ranji Trophy seasons
Domestic cricket competitions in 1981–82